Digangana Suryavanshi (born 15 October 1997) is an Indian actor, singer and author who is known from Hindi and Telugu films. Suryavanshi debuted her career in Hindi television and went on to appear in films. Her breakthrough role was 'Veera' in the StarPlus TV series Ek Veer Ki Ardaas...Veera. She also was in the reality show Bigg Boss 9 in 2015. Her Hindi film debut was in FryDay (2018), Telugu film debut in Hippi (2019) and Tamil film debut in Dhanusu Raasi Neyargale (2019).

Early life
Suryavanshi is the only child of Neeraj Suryavanshi and Sarita Suryavanshi. She completed her 12th board at Mithibai College, where she appeared for the exams during the shooting of Ek Veer Ki Ardaas...Veera. Digangana is pursuing an MBA at Narsee Monjee College in Mumbai.

Career 

Suryavanshi started her career at the age of seven as a child artist, debuting with the TV series Kya Hadsaa Kya Haqeeqat in 2002. When she was 14, Suryavanshi wrote, composed and sang a song, "I'm missing you", which she dedicated to her maternal grandmother. Suryavanshi also played supporting roles in shows like Shakuntala (2009), Krisshna Arjun and Ruk Jaana Nahin (2011–12). Suryavanshi landed her big break with StarPlus soap opera Ek Veer Ki Ardaas...Veera (2012–15), where she played the title role. In 2015, at the age of 17, she was the youngest celebrity contestant to have participated in the reality show Bigg Boss. She was evicted from the show on 7 December 2015. Suryavanshi participated in the Indian sports reality television show Box Cricket League season I, played for Mumbai Warriors and season II, played for Mumbai Tigers.

Suryavanshi debuted in Bollywood with two films, FryDay and Jalebi. Both films were released on 12 October 2018. Suryavanshi acted in the lead role with Govinda in the film Rangeela Raja, which was released on 18 January 2019.

Suryavanshi played the lead actress in the Telugu film Hippi, which was directed by Krishnan K.T. Nagarajan. A writer for Firstpost.com, Hemanth Kumar, wrote that Suryavanshi, "is good in her role and she might be the only one who took her role far too seriously in the film. Right from her introduction scene to the climax, she's consistently good in terms of her body language and her attitude that the role required."

Filmography

Films

Television

Music videos

Bibliography

See also 
 List of Hindi television actresses

References

External links

 
 

Living people
Indian television actresses
Indian soap opera actresses
21st-century Indian actresses
Indian women playback singers
Actresses in Hindi television
Bigg Boss (Hindi TV series) contestants
21st-century Indian women singers
21st-century Indian singers
1997 births
Actresses in Telugu cinema
Actresses in Hindi cinema
English-language writers from India
21st-century Indian women writers
21st-century Indian writers
Women writers from Maharashtra